Brillo may refer to:

 Brillo Pad, an American brand
 "Brillo" (song), by J Balvin and Rosalía
 Android Things, an operating system previously known as Project Brillo
 Andrew Neil (b. 1949), Scottish journalist and broadcaster nicknamed Brillo

See also